The Wilson-Clary House, also known as the Crisp House, is a historic home located at Laurens, Laurens County, South Carolina. The vernacular Victorian style house with Eastlake influences was constructed ca1892 for J. J. Wilson, Jr and Toccoa Irby Wilson.

The two-story frame house has two brick chimneys above a cross-gable roof. It has a single-story wraparound porch with a tent roof gazebo at its vertex and pedimented window surrounds. The interior features ceiling medallions, a marble mantel and an elaborate staircase.

It was listed on the National Register of Historic Places in 1986.

References

Houses on the National Register of Historic Places in South Carolina
Houses completed in 1892
Houses in Laurens County, South Carolina
Vernacular architecture in the United States
Victorian architecture in South Carolina
National Register of Historic Places in Laurens County, South Carolina